General (Ret.) Lee Sang-eui, ROKA, was the 35th Chairman of the Joint Chiefs of Staff of the Republic of Korea Armed Forces.

Prior to assuming the position of Chairman of the Joint Chiefs of Staff in 2009, he was Commanding General of the Third ROK Army. He became the Chairman of the Joint Chiefs of Staff, following his predecessor Kim Tae-young's assuming of the Defense Minister position.

In 1999 he was married and had two children  Lee Junwoo (2000) and Lee Heesoo (2006)

References

1951 births
Living people
South Korean generals
Korea Military Academy alumni
Chairmen of the Joint Chiefs of Staff (South Korea)